In mathematics, the mean (topological) dimension of a topological dynamical system is a non-negative extended real number that is a measure of the complexity of the system. Mean dimension was first introduced in 1999 by Gromov. Shortly after it was developed and studied systematically by Lindenstrauss and Weiss. In particular they proved the following key fact: a system with finite topological entropy has zero mean dimension. For various topological dynamical systems with infinite topological entropy, the mean dimension can be calculated or at least bounded from below and above. This allows mean dimension to be used to distinguish between systems with infinite topological entropy. Mean dimension is also related to the problem of embedding topological  dynamical systems in shift spaces (over Euclidean cubes).

General definition
A topological dynamical system consists of a compact Hausdorff topological space  and a continuous self-map . For  define its order by

An open finite cover  refines , denoted , if for every , there is  so that . Let

The mean dimension is the non-negative extended real number:

where

Definition in the metric case 
Let

The mean dimension is the non-negative extended real number:

Properties
 If the Lebesgue covering dimension of the system is finite then its mean dimension vanishes, i.e. . 
 If the topological entropy of the system is finite then its mean dimension vanishes, i.e. .

Example
Let . Let  and  be the shift homeomorphism , then .

See also
 Dimension theory 
 Topological entropy 
 Universal spaces (in topology and topological dynamics)

References

External links
What is Mean Dimension? 

Entropy and information
Topological dynamics